Mickey Mouse Works (also known as Disney's Mickey Mouse Works or simply Mouse Works) is an American animated television series produced by Walt Disney Television Animation featuring Mickey Mouse and his friends in a series of animated shorts. It is the first Disney television animated series to be produced in widescreen high definition.

Mickey Mouse Works is similar to a variety show, with skits starring Mickey Mouse, Minnie Mouse, Donald Duck, Daisy Duck, Goofy, Pluto and Ludwig Von Drake while Horace Horsecollar, Clarabelle Cow, Huey, Dewey and Louie, Chip 'n Dale, Scrooge McDuck, Pete, Humphrey the Bear, J. Audubon Woodlore, Dinah the Dachshund, Butch the Bulldog, Mortimer Mouse, Jose Carioca, and Clara Cluck appear as supporting characters. Musical themes for each character were composed by Stephen James Taylor with a live 12-piece band and extensive use of the fretless guitar to which the music of the series was nominated for an Annie Award in both 1999 and 2001. The shorts from the series were later used in House of Mouse with the exception of two due to their offensive content.

The show returned to Disney Channel in Canada from December 1, 2015 to September 2, 2016 and came back from December 5 to 30, 2016. However, like 101 Dalmatians: The Series, only about half of the shorts aired, and most of the ones that did air were edited down (this was most likely due to scenes that were dubbed inappropriate for preschoolers). In Finland, the show was renamed Akun Tehdas ("Donald's Factory") due to how immensely popular cartoon icon Donald and his "Duckverse" comics was among Finns. Gags were entirely removed as well due to possible redundancy – though sounds were left in still. In France, the show was called Mickey Mania.

Overview
Mickey Mouse Works was produced to recreate the golden age of Disney's animated shorts featuring Disney's most popular characters and Mickey Mouse's first revival series. By using basic colors and the original sound effects, effort was put forth to capture the look and feel of "classic" Disney.

Each half-hour episode consisted of a variety of cartoons, which are skits, varying in length from ninety seconds to twelve minutes. These shorts fell into three general types: 90-second gag cartoons, the 7 and a half-minute character cartoons, and 12-minute "Mouse Tales" based on famous stories. The character-based segments also included "Silly Symphonies", carrying on the tradition of that series of theatrical shorts.

The gag shorts, which lasted 90 seconds each, were shown with the following umbrella titles:
 Mickey to the Rescue: Mickey tries to rescue Minnie from Pete's trap-laden hideout.
 Maestro Minnie: Minnie conducts an orchestra of anthropomorphic rebellious musical instruments.
 Goofy's Extreme Sports: Goofy shows off extreme sports in the words of his off-screen narrator.
 Donald's Dynamite: Donald's activity is interrupted by the appearance of a well-placed bomb.
 Von Drake's House of Genius: Ludwig Von Drake shows off an invention of his which goes haywire.
 Pluto Gets the Paper: Pluto goes through a bit of problems trying to fetch the newspaper for Mickey.

With no established schedule or routine, Mickey Mouse Works was designed to look like one spontaneous flow. Adding to that feeling were the show's opening credits which ended differently each week, the only constant being an elaborate interruption from a spotlight-stealing Donald Duck.

While most skits involved individual characters, some have Mickey, Donald and Goofy running a special service group. Most Goofy skits have him doing a "how-to" segment always accompanied by a narrator. Most Donald segments were about him trying to accomplish a certain task which never works out right, frustrating him.

Characters

Main
 Mickey Mouse (voiced by Wayne Allwine, Quinton Flynn in "Minnie Takes Care of Pluto") is the main protagonist of the series, he gets himself entangled in many farcical situations due to his guilelessness, but is overall a calm character. He is seen in the intro going to the scene of the Mickey Mouse works logo saying "oh boy!" before brandishing a coin.
 Minnie Mouse (voiced by Russi Taylor) is Mickey's love interest, like how Donald gets frustrated, Minnie is often peeved by Mickey's impulsiveness and Daisy's loud-mouth, though she is mature for her age. She is seen during the intro practicing some music for the Mickey Mouse Works cartoons.
 Donald Duck (voiced by Tony Anselmo) is one of Mickey's friends, he is well known for his hot-temper, which often lashes out by impatience and self-righteousness. He's seen in the intro in the drawings holding a black bomb, especially for his cold opening accidents at the end.
 Daisy Duck (voiced by Diane Michelle in season 1, Tress MacNeille in season 2) is Donald's girlfriend, though they both have quick-tempers, Daisy is shown to be aloof and more selfish and dull-witted in this show. She is seen in the intro where she is making sure that everything is clean.
 Goofy (voiced by Bill Farmer) is one of Mickey's friends, he isn't the smartest character on the show, his idiocy usually irritates his friends. He is seen in the intro pressing a button before going up and drops the remote control and starts to fall as he almost caught balance.
 Pluto (voiced by Bill Farmer) is Mickey's loyal dog who is often combative towards some animals. He is even seen in the intro which is a drawing that he is holding a newspaper.
 Ludwig Von Drake (voiced by Corey Burton) is a scientist duck who is shown to be highly intelligent but insane. He is also seen pressing a button at the beginning of the intro.

Supporting
 Pete (voiced by Jim Cummings) is Mickey's rival. He is intimidating and aggressive, but extremely gullible.
 Huey, Dewey, and Louie (voiced by Russi Taylor), Donald's naughty nephews.
 Chip 'n' Dale (voiced by Tress MacNeille and Corey Burton), two chipmunks, common rivals of Donald and Pluto.
 Mortimer Mouse (voiced by Maurice LaMarche) is Mickey's sleazy rival who is charming, but in a condescending and harmful manner, he often flirts with Minnie Mouse and/or Daisy, his most famous catchphrase is "I CHACHA!" (pronounced "ha cha cha").
 Clarabelle Cow (voiced by April Winchell), a friend of Mickey's gang.
 Chief O'Hara (voiced by Corey Burton), police chief in the town.
 Louie the Mountain Lion (voiced by Frank Welker), a mountain lion who wants to eat Goofy.
 Butch the Bulldog (voiced by Frank Welker), a big bulldog, rival of Pluto.
 Dinah the Dachshund (voiced by Frank Welker), Pluto's love interest.
 The Phantom Blot (voiced by John O'Hurley) is the mysterious shadow in the distance, who wants to steal all the colors for himself and leave the real world stuck in black and white.
 Salty the Seal (voiced by Frank Welker), a playful seal.
 Figaro (voiced by Frank Welker), Minnie's pet cat.
 Humphrey the Bear (voiced by Jim Cummings), a bear of the forest.
 J. Audubon Woodlore (voiced by Corey Burton), a ranger in charge of Humphrey.
 Aracuan Bird (voiced by Frank Welker)
 Horace Horsecollar (voiced by Bill Farmer)
 Clara Cluck (voiced by Russi Taylor)
 Scrooge McDuck (voiced by Alan Young)
 José Carioca (voiced by Rob Paulsen), an old friend of Donald.
 Baby Shelby (introduced) (voiced by Jeff Bennett), a small turtle who always torments Donald.
 Mrs. Turtle (introduced) (voiced by Estelle Harris), Shelby's mother.
 Mr. Jollyland (voiced by Jeff Bennett)

Production
When the show was replaced by House of Mouse in January 2001, most of the Mouse Works segments were repeated there but the original Mickey Mouse Works format has never been seen again. However, when the shorts were shown right before and after Toon Disney's Big Movie Show on weekdays, they were shown with the Mickey Mouse Works closing credits. Minnie Takes Care of Pluto was not re-run in House of Mouse due to its  dark content. For unknown reasons, Pluto Gets the Paper: Vending Machine was not on House of Mouse either.

Four of the gag cartoons were released theatrically with various Disney films during 1998 and 1999 and released to theaters as commercials for the show. The cartoons included:
 Goofy's Extreme Sports: Skating the Half Pipe with I'll Be Home for Christmas 
 Goofy's Extreme Sports: Paracycling with Mighty Joe Young
 Pluto Gets the Paper: Spaceship with My Favorite Martian
 Donald's Dynamite: Opera Box with Doug's 1st Movie

Episodes

Series overview

Season 1 (1999)

Season 2 (1999–2000)

Home media 
Some shorts are available in Europe on DVD under the title Mickey's Laugh Factory. While some shorts have the Mickey Mouse Works title card background, others have the House of Mouse version (the Mouse Works version has various mechanics in the background including a Mickey-shaped one and one with the Mouse Works text inside it, but the House of Mouse version has various moving swirls). Cartoons include Hickory Dickory Mickey, Mickey Tries to Cook, Organ Donors, Mickey's Airplane Kit, Street Cleaner, Mickey's New Car, Bubble Gum, Mickey's Big Break and Mickey's Mix-Up.

In Disney's Learning Adventures: Mickey's Seeing the World, there were two cartoons featured: Around the World in Eighty Days and Mickey's Mechanical House (both as two stories).

On November 11, 2008, the eighth wave of Walt Disney Treasures was released. One of the sets released in this wave, The Chronological Donald, Volume Four, features a handful of Donald-centric shorts from both Mickey Mouse Works and House of Mouse as bonuses, including Bird Brained Donald, Donald and the Big Nut, Donald's Charmed Date, Donald's Dinner Date, Donald's Failed Fourth, Donald's Rocket Ruckus, Donald's Shell Shots, Donald's Valentine Dollar, Music Store Donald and Survival of the Woodchucks.

References

External links 
 
 Mickey Mouse Works at the Big Cartoon DataBase

1990s American animated television series
2000s American animated television series
1990s American anthology television series
2000s American anthology television series
1990s American sketch comedy television series
2000s American sketch comedy television series
1990s American variety television series
2000s American variety television series
1999 American television series debuts
2000 American television series endings
ABC Kids (TV programming block)
American Broadcasting Company original programming
American children's animated anthology television series
American children's animated comedy television series
Cartoon controversies
Children's sketch comedy
Disney Channel original programming
Donald Duck television series
English-language television shows
Mickey Mouse television series
Television series by Disney Television Animation
Television shows set in the United States
Annie Award winners
Animated television series about ducks
Animated television series about cats
Animated television series about horses
Television series about chickens
Animated television series about dogs
Animated television series about mice and rats